Gonystylus augescens grows as a small tree. The twigs are dark brown. The specific epithet augescens is from the Latin meaning "elongating", referring to the inflorescence. Habitat is lowland mixed dipterocarp forest. G. augescens is endemic to Borneo.

References

augescens
Endemic flora of Borneo
Trees of Borneo
Plants described in 1946